Lesbian, gay, bisexual, and transgender (LGBT) persons in  San Marino may face legal challenges not experienced by non-LGBT residents. Both male and female same-sex sexual activity are legal in San Marino, but households headed by same-sex couples are not eligible for the same legal protections available to opposite-sex couples.

Discrimination on account of sexual orientation is banned under 2019 amendments to the Constitution of San Marino. In November 2018, the Grand and General Council approved a bill to legalise civil unions. The law, which took effect on 5 December 2018 and became fully operational on 11 February 2019, following a number of further legal and administrative changes, allows same-sex and opposite-sex couples to enter into a union and receive some of the rights and benefits of marriage.

Legality of same-sex sexual activity
In September 2004, Article 274 of the Sammarinese Penal Code was repealed. Under this article, homosexual acts could be punished with imprisonment from three months up to one year, if they had been engaged in "habitually" and thereby caused "public scandal".

The total ban on homosexuality was abolished in San Marino in 1864. In 1974, however, the Parliament of San Marino adopted a new penal code that came into force in 1975 and contained Article 274. There are no reports, however, that Article 274 was ever applied. It was the only special provision on homosexuality in the Sammarinese Penal Code.

The age of consent is equally set at 14 for different-sex and same-sex sexual acts. Additionally, it is an offence to "incite a minor under 18 years to sexual corruption".

Recognition of same-sex relationships

Civil unions
On 15 November 2018, the San Marino Grand Council approved a bill to legalise civil unions in the microstate. The law, which came into effect on 5 December 2018, became fully operational on 11 February 2019, following a number of further legal and administrative changes. It allows same-sex and opposite-sex couples to enter into a union and receive certain legal rights with respect to residency, citizenship, pension rights, healthcare, succession rights, and stepchild adoption.

Same-sex marriage
In December 2017, the Sammarinese Parliament approved an amendment to a proposed 2018 budget law that would allow same-sex marriages of foreign couples to be performed in San Marino, with the aim of encouraging tourism. Sammarinese same-sex couples will still be banned from marrying. The government now has the task of drafting legislation to implement the amendment.

Discrimination protections and hate crime laws
On 28 April 2008, the Sammarinese Parliament approved amendments to the Penal Code, outlawing discrimination and hate speech on the basis of sexual orientation. The law took effect on 3 May 2008. The Penal Code also provides penalty enhancements to hate crimes motivated by the victim's sexual orientation.

In November 2018, during the final discussion of the civil union law, Deputy Davide Forcellini of the RETE Movement proposed to explicitly add the term sexual orientation to Article 4 of the Constitution. The proposal received support from the DM-SMT, the Party of Socialists and Democrats (PSD) and the Socialist Party (PS), as well as several independent deputies. In March 2019, the Parliament approved the proposal, 35 votes in favour, 8 against and 1 abstention. However, 39 votes were required. Due to failing to meet this threshold, the text was submitted to a referendum. On 2 June 2019, voters approved the amendment, with 71.46% voting in favour.

Article 4 of the San Marino Constitution now reads as follows:
 
 All are equal before the law, without distinction of sex, sexual orientation, personal, economic, social, political and religious conditions.

In November 2019, during the country's Universal Periodic Review, San Marino accepted recommendations from Liechtenstein, Luxembourg and Mexico to outlaw discrimination on the basis of gender identity.

Military service
The Sammarinese Armed Forces does not explicitly ban LGBT people from serving. The code of conduct of the police force prohibits unfair discrimination in recruitment. Furthermore, police officials are trained to properly respond to and identify discrimination, whether in public or within the police force itself.

Blood donation
Gay and bisexual men are allowed to donate blood in San Marino.

Living conditions
Until recently LGBT people in San Marino went unnoticed, with very few public debates or discussions involving the issue of LGBT rights, either in the media, society in general or politics. When LGBT groups in San Marino asked the government to recognize 17 May as the International Day Against Homophobia, Transphobia and Biphobia in the early 2000s, it rejected the proposition.

The country's sex education programme, accompanied by emotional education programmes, expressly provide for knowledge of LGBT rights. The "Curriculum of education to citizenship" also provides for knowledge of LGBT matters.

There are occasionally reports of violence and hate crimes directed at the LGBT community in San Marino. In June 2019, the electorate voted with 71% to outlaw discrimination on the basis of sexual orientation.

Summary table

See also

Politics of San Marino
LGBT rights in Europe

References